Aurel Toma (July 30, 1911 – August 25, 1980) was a Romanian professional boxer of Bulgarian origin who competed from 1931 to 1948.

Career
He held the European bantamweight title twice, firstly in 1936 and again from 1938 to 1939. After he won the first bantamweight title in 1936, Toma was decorated by king Carol II of Romania of whom for a while he was a personal driver and a boxing teacher of his son, Prince Michael. Toma was the only boxer to knock out Benny Lynch. He is buried at the Riverside National Cemetery, in Riverside, California. A sports hall in Babadag, Romania is named after him.

Professional boxing record

|-
|align="center" colspan=8|47 Wins (15 knockouts, 31 decisions, 1 disqualification), 16 Losses (7 knockouts, 9 decisions), 11 Draws 
|-
| align="center" style="border-style: none none solid solid; background: #e3e3e3"|Result
| align="center" style="border-style: none none solid solid; background: #e3e3e3"|Record
| align="center" style="border-style: none none solid solid; background: #e3e3e3"|Opponent
| align="center" style="border-style: none none solid solid; background: #e3e3e3"|Type
| align="center" style="border-style: none none solid solid; background: #e3e3e3"|Round
| align="center" style="border-style: none none solid solid; background: #e3e3e3"|Date
| align="center" style="border-style: none none solid solid; background: #e3e3e3"|Location
| align="center" style="border-style: none none solid solid; background: #e3e3e3"|Notes
|-
|Loss
|
|align=left| Henry Davis
|KO
|6 
|1948-04-13	
|align=left| Civic Auditorium, Honolulu, Hawaii, United States
|align=left|
|-
|Draw
|
|align=left| Tsuneshi Maruo
|PTS
|8 
|1948-03-16
|align=left| Civic Auditorium, Honolulu, Hawaii, United States
|align=left|
|-
|Loss
|
|align=left| Manny Ortega
|KO
|6 
|1948-02-27	
|align=left| Liberty Hall, El Paso, Texas, United States
|align=left|
|-
|Loss
|
|align=left| Luis Castillo
|KO
|6 
|1947-12-02
|align=left| Auditorium, Portland, Oregon, United States
|align=left|
|-
|Win
|
|align=left| Joey Clemo
|MD
|10 
|1947-11-07
|align=left| Auditorium, Portland, Oregon, United States
|align=left|
|-
|Win
|
|align=left| Jackie Turner
|UD
|10 
|1947-10-21
|align=left| Auditorium, Portland, Oregon, United States
|align=left|
|-
|Loss
|
|align=left| Joey Dolan
|SD
|10 
|1947-10-14
|align=left| Armory, Spokane, Washington, United States
|align=left|
|-
|Win
|
|align=left| Joe Tambe
|KO
|2 
|1947-09-23
|align=left| Ryan's Auditorium, Fresno, California, United States
|align=left|
|-
|Win
|
|align=left| Joey Dolan
|PTS
|10 
|1947-03-11	
|align=left| Civic Auditorium, Seattle, Washington, United States
|align=left|
|-
|Win
|
|align=left| Joey Clemo
|PTS
|10 
|1947-02-21
|align=left| Auditorium, Portland, Oregon, United States
|align=left|
|-
|Loss
|
|align=left| Tony Olivera
|PTS
|10 
|1942-07-13
|align=left| Coliseum Bowl, San Francisco, California, United States
|align=left|
|-
|Loss
|
|align=left| Bobby Carroll 
|TKO
|9 
|1942-02-02	
|align=left| Sacramento, California, United States
|align=left|
|-
|Draw
|
|align=left| Tony Olivera
|PTS
|10 
|1941-09-19
|align=left| Civic Auditorium, San Francisco, California, United States
|align=left|
|-
|Win
|
|align=left| Jackie Jurich
|PTS
|10 
|1941-08-25
|align=left| Civic Auditorium, San Francisco, California, United States
|align=left|
|-
|Win
|
|align=left| Adolph Samuels
|PTS
|6 
|1941-05-16	
|align=left| Legion Stadium, Hollywood, California, United States
|align=left|
|-
|Win
|
|align=left| Bobby Siegel
|PTS
|6 
|1941-04-04	
|align=left| Legion Stadium, Hollywood, California, United States
|align=left|
|-
|Win
|
|align=left| Nat Corum
|PTS
|6 
|1941-03-14
|align=left| Legion Stadium, Hollywood, California, United States
|align=left|
|-
|Loss
|
|align=left| Bill Speary
|TKO
|5 
|1940-12-09	
|align=left| Arena, Philadelphia, Pennsylvania, United States
|align=left|
|-
|Loss
|
|align=left| Vince Dell'Orto
|TKO
|4 
|1940-11-11
|align=left| St. Nicholas Arena, New York, United States
|align=left|
|-
|Win
|
|align=left| Pablo Dano
|PTS
|10 
|1940-11-07	
|align=left| Savannah, Georgia, United States
|align=left|
|-
|Win
|
|align=left| Jackie Callura
|PTS
|10 
|1940-05-29	
|align=left| Auditorium, Oakland, California, United States
|align=left|
|-
|Draw
|
|align=left| Tony Olivera
|PTS
|10 
|1940-05-17
|align=left| Legion Stadium, Hollywood, California, United States
|align=left|
|-
|Loss
|
|align=left| Chick Delaney
|PTS
|10 
|1940-04-17
|align=left| Auditorium, Oakland, California, United States
|align=left|
|-
|Win
|
|align=left| Tommy Kiene
|TKO
|3 
|1940-03-28	
|align=left| Savannah, Georgia, United States
|align=left|
|-
|Loss
|
|align=left| Pablo Dano
|PTS
|10 
|1940-01-23
|align=left| Broadway Arena, Brooklyn, New York, United States
|align=left|
|-
|Draw
|
|align=left| Pablo Dano
|PTS
|8 
|1940-01-02
|align=left| Broadway Arena, Brooklyn, New York, United States
|align=left|
|-
|Win
|
|align=left| Nicky Jerome
|TKO
|6 
|1939-12-19
|align=left| Broadway Arena, Brooklyn, New York, United States
|align=left|
|-
|Win
|
|align=left| Victor Corchado
|PTS
|8 
|1939-11-25
|align=left| Rockland Palace, New York, United States
|align=left|
|-
|Loss
|
|align=left| Ernst Weiss
|RTD
|11 
|1939-08-11
|align=left| Sportpalast, Schöneberg, Berlin, Germany
|align=left|
|-
|Loss
|
|align=left| Tommy Burns
|PTS
|10 
|1939-03-24
|align=left| Orange Halls, Bellshill, United Kingdom
|align=left|
|-
|Win
|
|align=left| Teddy O'Neill
|KO
|10 
|1939-01-27	
|align=left| Edinburgh, Scotland, United Kingdom
|align=left|
|-
|Win
|
|align=left| Len Hampston
|RTD
|5 
|1938-11-14		
|align=left| National Sporting Club, London, United Kingdom
|align=left|
|-
|Win
|
|align=left| Benny Lynch
|KO
|3 
|1938-10-03
|align=left| National Sporting Club, London, United Kingdom
|align=left|
|-
|Win
|
|align=left| Gino Cattaneo	
|DQ
|8 
|1938-06-04	
|align=left| Stadionul Venus, Bucharest, Romania
|align=left|
|-
|Win
|
|align=left| Joseph Decico	
|PTS
|10 
|1938-03-31	
|align=left| Salle Wagram, Paris, France
|align=left|
|-
|Win
|
|align=left| Maurice Huguenin	
|KO
|2 
|1938-03-16	
|align=left| Élysée Montmartre, Paris, France
|align=left|
|-
|Win
|
|align=left| Gaston Maton	
|KO
|2 
|1938-02-10	
|align=left| Salle Wagram, Paris, France
|align=left|
|-
|Win
|
|align=left| Jim Brady
|PTS
|10 
|1937-12-13	
|align=left| Earls Court Arena, Kensington, United Kingdom
|align=left|
|-
|Win
|
|align=left| Johnny McManus
|KO
|9 
|1937-11-29	
|align=left| Harringay Arena, Harringay, United Kingdom
|align=left|
|-
|Draw
|
|align=left| Jim Brady
|PTS
|10 
|1937-11-15	
|align=left| Earls Court Empress Hall, Kensington, United Kingdom
|align=left|
|-
|Win
|
|align=left| Victor Perez
|RTD
|6 
|1937-10-03	
|align=left| Bucharest, Romania
|align=left|
|-
|Win
|
|align=left| Ion Sandu
|PTS
|12 
|1937-08-31	
|align=left| Bucharest, Romania
|align=left|
|-
|Win
|
|align=left| Joey Archibald
|PTS
|8 
|1937-04-05	
|align=left| Madison Square Garden, New York, United States
|align=left|
|-
|Win
|
|align=left| Jimmy Martin
|TKO
|5 
|1937-03-16	
|align=left| Broadway Arena, Brooklyn, New York, United States
|align=left|
|-
|Win
|
|align=left| Henry Hook
|PTS
|10 
|1937-02-2	
|align=left| Broadway Arena, Brooklyn, New York, United States
|align=left|
|-
|Win
|
|align=left| Richard LiBrandi
|TKO
|6 
|1937-01-26	
|align=left| Broadway Arena, Brooklyn, New York, United States
|align=left|
|-
|Win
|
|align=left| Georges Bataille
|PTS
|10 
|1936-11-26	
|align=left|  Salle Wagram, Paris, France
|align=left|
|-
|Win
|
|align=left| Eugene Lorenzoni
|KO
|7 
|1936-10-27	
|align=left| Central Sporting Club, Paris, France
|align=left|
|-
|Win
|
|align=left| Joseph Decico
|KO
|11 
|1936-07-26		
|align=left| Stadionul Venus, Bucharest, Romania
|align=left|
|-
|Win
|
|align=left| Valentin Angelmann
|PTS
|10 
|1936-04-09		
|align=left| Salle Wagram, Paris, France
|align=left|
|-
|Win
|
|align=left| Roger Cotti
|PTS
|10 
|1936-03-19		
|align=left| Ring de Pantin, Le Mans, France
|align=left|
|-
|Win
|
|align=left| Eugène Huat
|PTS
|10 
|1936-03-06		
|align=left| Élysée Montmartre, Paris, France
|align=left|
|-
|Win
|
|align=left| Émile Pladner
|PTS
|10 
|1936-01-28		
|align=left| Central Sporting Club, Paris, France
|align=left|
|-
|Win
|
|align=left| Victor Perez
|PTS 
|10 
|1935-12-31		
|align=left| Central Sporting Club, Paris, France
|align=left|
|-
|Win
|
|align=left| Henri Barras
|PTS
|10 
|1935-12-10		
|align=left| Central Sporting Club, Paris, France
|align=left|
|-
|Win
|
|align=left| Henri Sanchez
|PTS
|10 
|1935-11-30		
|align=left| Central Sporting Club, Paris, France
|align=left|
|-
|Loss
|
|align=left| Gheorghe Popescu
|PTS
|10 
|1935-10-27		
|align=left| Ploiești, Romania
|align=left|
|-
|Draw
|
|align=left| Frans Machtens
|PTS
|10 
|1935-09-28		
|align=left| Arenele Romane, Bucharest, Romania
|align=left|
|-
|Win
|
|align=left| Lucian Popescu
|PTS
|10 
|1935-05-15		
|align=left| Arenele Romane, Bucharest, Romania
|align=left|
|-
|Win
|
|align=left| Ion Gurun
|PTS
|10 
|1934-12-06		
|align=left| Bucharest, Romania
|align=left|
|-
|Draw
|
|align=left| Gheorghe Rapeanu
|PTS
|6 
|1934-07-21		
|align=left| Arenele Romane, Bucharest, Romania
|align=left|
|-
|Loss
|
|align=left| Jackie Brown
|PTS
|12 
|1934-04-16		
|align=left| Kings Hall, Manchester, United Kingdom
|align=left|
|-
|Loss
|
|align=left| Maurice Filhol
|PTS
|10 
|1934-02-17		
|align=left| Central Sporting Club, Paris, France
|align=left|
|-
|Win
|
|align=left| Étienne Mura
|PTS
|10 
|1934-01-23		
|align=left| Central Sporting Club, Paris, France
|align=left|
|-
|Win
|
|align=left| Henri Sanchez
|PTS
|10 
|1934-01-06		
|align=left| Central Sporting Club, Paris, France
|align=left|
|-
|Loss
|
|align=left| Maurice Huguenin
|PTS
|10 
|1933-12-16		
|align=left| Central Sporting Club, Paris, France
|align=left|
|-
|Draw
|
|align=left| Ion Gurun
|PTS
|10 
|1933-06-17		
|align=left| Arenele Romane, Bucharest, Romania
|align=left|
|-
|Draw
|
|align=left| Joe Mediola
|PTS
|8 
|1932-12-21		
|align=left| Paris-Ring, Paris, France
|align=left|
|-
|Draw
|
|align=left| Ion Gurun
|PTS
|8 
|1932-11-05		
|align=left| Coloseum, Bucharest, Romania
|align=left|
|-
|Win
|
|align=left| Gheoghe Begheș
|PTS
|8 
|1932-10-26		
|align=left| Sala Constructori, Bucharest, Romania
|align=left|
|-
|Win
|
|align=left| Rene Chalange
|PTS
|10 
|1932-08-09		
|align=left| Bucharest, Romania
|align=left|
|-
|Win
|
|align=left| Nicolae Stamate
|RTD
|8 
|1932-07-23		
|align=left| Arenele Romane, Bucharest, Romania
|align=left|
|-
|Win
|
|align=left| Ion Gurun
|PTS
|6 
|1932-06-18		
|align=left| Arenele Romane, Bucharest, Romania
|align=left|
|-
|Draw
|
|align=left| Gheoghe Begheș
|PTS
|6 
|1931-06-13		
|align=left| Cinema Aurora-Calea Dudești, Bucharest, Romania
|align=left|
|}

References

External links
 
 

Flyweight boxers
Bantamweight boxers
Featherweight boxers
Burials at Riverside National Cemetery
Romanian expatriates in the United States
People from Babadag
1911 births
1980 deaths
Romanian male boxers
European Boxing Union champions